The Big Four Building is a historic 19th-century building in Downtown Sacramento, California. It is now located within Old Sacramento State Historic Park and the Old Sacramento National Historic District.

History
The Big Four House was originally three separate buildings constructed over 1851 to 1852, adjacent to the Sacramento River waterfront.  The original three structures included the Stanford Building, the Huntington & Hopkins Building, and the Miller Building.

The Big Four
The lower floors were occupied by merchants, three of whom later became The Big Four (with Charles Crocker), hence the buildings' name. The Big Four were associated with the founding of the First transcontinental railroad linking California with the Eastern U.S. — and were Collis Huntington, Mark Hopkins, Jr., Leland Stanford, and Charles Crocker. On the second floor these buildings they organized and ran the Central Pacific Railroad Company of California, to plan, build, and operate the western section of the first Transcontinental Railroad. They also founded the Southern Pacific Railroad here.  Huntington, Hopkins & Co., which imported and sold hardware, iron, steel, and coal, occupied 54 "K" Street. The second floor of these structures served as the first offices of the Central Pacific Railroad from 1862 to 1873.

By 1878 ownership was consolidated, and the structures were enlarged into one building. Over time it has also housed shops, including the Huntington & Hopkins Hardware Store, a bar and cafe, and a hotel on the second floor.

Landmark
The Big Four House was declared a National Historic Landmark on July 4, 1961. It is included within the Old Sacramento Historic District, which also is a National Historic Landmark and on the National Register of Historic Places since its establishment on October 15, 1966.

It was also formerly a California Historical Landmark of its own, but now is a Historic district contributing property included in the registration of the Old Sacramento National Historic District.

See also

History of Sacramento, California
Old Sacramento State Historic Park
National Register of Historic Places listings in Sacramento County, California
California Historical Landmarks in Sacramento County, California
Index: Historic districts in California

References

External links

Buildings and structures in Sacramento, California
History of Sacramento, California
National Register of Historic Places in Sacramento, California
National Historic Landmarks in California
Historic American Buildings Survey in California
California Historical Landmarks
Commercial buildings on the National Register of Historic Places in California
Southern Pacific Railroad
Railroad-related National Historic Landmarks
Old Sacramento State Historic Park
Individually listed contributing properties to historic districts on the National Register in California
National Historic Landmark District contributing properties